Jorge Ubico y Castañeda’s presidential term was extended to 15 March 1949 by a Constituent Assembly on 11 September 1941. 
Assumed office 15 March 1943.

Bibliography 

Villagrán Kramer, Francisco. Biografía política de Guatemala: años de guerra y años de paz. FLACSO-Guatemala, 2004. 

Political handbook of the world 1943. New York, 1944. 

Elections in the Americas A Data Handbook Volume 1. North America, Central America, and the Caribbean. Edited by Dieter Nohlen. 2005. 

Leonard, Thomas M. The United States and Central America, 1944-1949: perceptions of political dynamics. Tuscaloosa: The University of Alabama Press. 1984.

Parker, Franklin D. The Central American republics. Westport: Greenwood Press. Reprint of 1964 original. 1981.

Taplin, Glen W. Middle American governors. Metuchen: Scarecrow Press. 1972.

1941
1941 elections in Central America
1941 in Guatemala